C&W may refer to:

Country music (Country and Western)
Cable & Wireless plc
Cushman & Wakefield Plc, real estate services firm.
C&W, a brand of frozen goods owned by Pinnacle Foods
Co-operative Wholesale Society, a former name of The Co-operative Group, UK